Kenneth Langstreth Johnson FRS FREng (19 March 1925 – 21 September 2015) was a British engineer, Professor of Engineering at the University of Cambridge from 1977 to 1992 and a Fellow of Jesus College, Cambridge. Most of his research was in the areas of tribology and contact mechanics.

Education
Johnson was educated at Barrow Grammar School and the University of Manchester where he was awarded MScTech, Master of Arts and Doctor of Philosophy degrees supervised by H. Wright Baker.

Awards and honours
Johnson was elected a Fellow of the Royal Academy of Engineering in 1987, a Fellow of the Royal Society (FRS) in 1982 and won their Royal Medal in 2003 "In recognition of his outstanding work in the field of contact mechanics." His 1971 paper with Kevin Kendall and Alan D. Roberts forms the basis of modern theories of contact mechanics. He also made significant contributions to the understanding of fluid rheology under elastohydrodynamic lubrication conditions.

He received the International Award from the Society of Tribologists and Lubrication Engineers in 1983. He was awarded the Tribology Gold Medal from the Institution of Mechanical Engineers in 1985. He was awarded the Mayo D. Hersey Award from the American Society of Mechanical Engineers in 1991. In 1999, Johnson won the William Prager Medal awarded by the Society of Engineering Science. He was also awarded the 2006 Timoshenko Medal. 

He died on 21 September 2015.

References

Royal Medal winners
English mechanical engineers
2015 deaths
Fellows of Jesus College, Cambridge
Fellows of the Royal Society
1925 births
Fellows of the Royal Academy of Engineering
People from Barrow-in-Furness
Tribologists
Professors of engineering (Cambridge)